The Becaș is a right tributary of the river Someșul Mic in Romania. It discharges into the Someșul Mic near Cluj-Napoca.

References

Rivers of Romania
Rivers of Cluj County